Pleomothra is a genus of crustacean found in the Caribbean. First described in 1989, the genus has 2 identified species as of 2008. It is the sole member of family Pleomothridae, but was previously placed in family Godzilliidae.

The genus is in the group Remipedia where all species are blind, and the entire body consists of a single, long line of joints. Individuals swim slowly on their backs.

Species
Pleomothra apletocheles (1989)
Pleomothra fragilis (2008)

References 

Remipedia
Crustaceans described in 1989